A Man Betrayed (UK title Citadel of Crime, TV title Wheel of Fortune) is a 1941 American film directed by John H. Auer and starring John Wayne.

Plot
Lynn Hollister, a bucolic lawyer takes on big-city corruption. He sets out to prove that an above-suspicion politician Boss Thomas "Tom" Cameron is actually a crook. Hollister is in love with the politician's daughter, Sabra.

Cast
 John Wayne as Lynn Hollister
 Frances Dee as Sabra Cameron
 Edward Ellis as Boss Thomas "Tom" Cameron
 Wallace Ford as Casey ("Globe" newspaper reporter)
 Ward Bond as Floyd, Amato's goon
 Harold Huber as Morris "Morrie" Slade
 Alexander Granach as T. Amato, Club Inferno Manager
 Barnett Parker as George, the Camerons' Butler
 Edwin Stanley as the Prosecutor
 Harry Hayden as lawyer Don Langworthy
 Tim Ryan as Mr. Wilson, insurance agent
 Russell Hicks as District Attorney C. R. Pringle
 Pierre Watkin as the Governor
 Ferris Taylor as Mayor Al

See also
 John Wayne filmography

References

External links
 
 
 
 

1941 films
1940s crime comedy-drama films
1940s romantic comedy-drama films
American crime comedy-drama films
American romantic comedy-drama films
American black-and-white films
1940s English-language films
Films directed by John H. Auer
Republic Pictures films
1940s American films